Owen Gordon Edward Boxall (born  in Sidcup) is an English male weightlifter, competing in the 94 kg category and representing England and Great Britain at international competitions. He represented England at the 2014 Commonwealth Games in the 94 kg class and England at the 2018 Commonwealth Games in the 105 kg class, where he won a bronze medal. He has also competed at the 2014 World Weightlifting Championships in the 94 kg class and the 2017 World Weightlifting Championships in the 105 kg class. His coach is Andrew Callard.

Major results

References

External links

Profile at britishweightlifting.org

1990 births
Living people
English male weightlifters
People from Sidcup
Weightlifters at the 2014 Commonwealth Games
Commonwealth Games medallists in weightlifting
Commonwealth Games bronze medallists for England
20th-century English people
21st-century English people
Medallists at the 2018 Commonwealth Games